Thomas G. Shaw (born December 13, 1938) is an American professional golfer who has played on both the PGA Tour and the Champions Tour.

Shaw was born in Wichita, Kansas. He attended the University of Oregon in Eugene from 1959–1962, and was an All-American member of the golf team. He helped Oregon win the Pacific Coast Conference title in 1959. Shaw graduated and turned pro in 1962. He joined the PGA Tour in 1963.

Shaw won four PGA Tour events and had over two dozen top-10 finishes. In 1966, he was seriously injured in a car accident on the way to the Bob Hope Classic. In 1971, he won twice, earned $96,220, and finished 15th on the money list. His best finish in a major was a T-21 at the 1969 PGA Championship.

Shaw began play on the Senior PGA Tour in 1989, and was one of five rookies to win on tour that year. His two wins on the senior tour included one senior major, at The Tradition in 1993 when he defeated Mike Hill by one stroke. He has over two dozen top-10 finishes at this level also.

Shaw was inducted into the University of Oregon Athletics Hall of Fame in 1997. He lives in Fort Lauderdale, Florida.

Age controversy
Shaw claimed throughout his career on the PGA Tour to be four years younger than the age in some record books. He was suspected by some of being older, notably by Frank Hannigan, who as Executive Director of the United States Golf Association paired him with the then-19-year-old Ben Crenshaw and 24-year-old Johnny Miller, both known as fast players, for the first two rounds of the 1971 U.S. Open for his apparent amusement. As it turned out, Hannigan was right; in 1988, Shaw produced a birth certificate proving that he had been born on the same date in 1938, which made him eligible for the Senior PGA Tour (now the Champions Tour) starting with the 1989 season.

Professional wins (8)

PGA Tour wins (4)

Other wins (1)
1988 South Florida PGA Championship

Senior PGA Tour wins (2)

Other senior wins (1)
1989 Senior Slam of Golf at Querétaro

Champions Tour major championships

Wins (1)

References

External links

American male golfers
PGA Tour golfers
PGA Tour Champions golfers
Winners of senior major golf championships
Golfers from Wichita, Kansas
Golfers from Florida
Sportspeople from Fort Lauderdale, Florida
1938 births
Living people